Ramsar International Airport  is an international airport in Ramsar, Mazandaran province, Iran.

Ramsar was one of the popular cities of northern Iran during the Pahlavi era and the airport was constructed to serve tourists visiting the city. Mohammad Reza Shah and other pahlavi family members also had palaces in Ramsar, therefore the airport was built to serve the former royal family of Iran or the foreign officials visiting the Shah from Tehran. The airport also established special flights for employees of National Iranian Oil Company to bring them from Ahvaz to the north of Iran.

Nowadays Ramsar International Airport is used for private and spirt flights along the Caspian Sea coasts as well as weekly public flights to Tehran, Mashhad, and Isfahan.

Airlines and destinations

References

External links
 Official site

Airports in Iran
Buildings and structures in Mazandaran Province
Transportation in Mazandaran Province